Stephanie Maxwell-Pierson (born January 4, 1964 in Somerville, New Jersey) is an American rower.

References

 
 

1964 births
Living people
Rowers at the 1988 Summer Olympics
Rowers at the 1992 Summer Olympics
Olympic bronze medalists for the United States in rowing
American female rowers
World Rowing Championships medalists for the United States
Medalists at the 1992 Summer Olympics
21st-century American women